Sir Eric Wyndham White KCMG (1913–1980) was a British administrator and economist. He was founder and first executive secretary of the General Agreement on Tariffs and Trade between 1948 and 1965. He was the first director-general of General Agreement on Tariffs and Trade from 1965 to 1968.

Born on 26 January 1913, White was educated at the Westminster City School and the London School of Economics. He graduated as a LLB with first class honours and in 1938 was called to the bar by the Middle Temple. He was an assistant lecturer at the LSE until the Second World War started when he moved to the Ministry of Economic Warfare. In 1942 he became the First Secretary at the British Embassy in Washington.

In 1945 he became Special Assistant to the European Director of the United Nations Relief and Rehabilitation Administration. He became involved in the forming of a secretariat for a new international trade organisation, the General Agreement on Tariffs and Trade in 1948 and became the first Director-General.

White died aged 67 on 27 January 1980 in France after suffering a heart attack while swimming.

References

External links
Biography at WTO

1913 births
1980 deaths
Directors-General of the World Trade Organization
General Agreement on Tariffs and Trade
Knights Commander of the Order of St Michael and St George
Members of the Middle Temple
Alumni of the London School of Economics
20th-century  British economists
20th-century British lawyers